The Sea.Hear.Now Festival (aka Sea Hear Now) is an annual music, art and ocean sustainability festival featuring a professional surfing competition held in Asbury Park, New Jersey.  Held on the beach and boardwalk in September, it is produced by, among others, rock photographer Danny Clinch, Tim Donnelly, HM Wollman, and C3 Presents’ Tim Sweetwood.

Digital pop culture magazine The Pop Break named Sea.Hear.Now the best new music festival of the year in 2018. Billed as a celebration of live music, art, and surf culture, a portion of proceeds go to ocean-focused and environmental charities such as the Surfrider Foundation and Save the Bay.

History

2018

The inaugural festival was held in September 2018.

Debbie Harry wore a cape during her performance with Blondie with the message, “Stop Fucking the Planet.”     The sustainability efforts at the 2018 festival featured reusable water bottle refilling stations, a “rock and recycle” program to help clean up waste/trash, and an opportunity to join the New Jersey chapter of the Surfrider Foundation.

Pro surfers Quincy Davis, Sam Hammer, Balaram Stack, Pat Schmidt, and Mike Gleason competed at the festival's surf exhibition.

The 2018 lineup included:

Blondie
Bruce Springsteen (unannounced surprise guest)
Social Distortion
Incubus
Jack Johnson
Ben Harper
Kaleo
Brandi Carlile
Soja
Frank Turner
The Wailers
Preservation Hall Jazz Band

2019

The 2019 festival was held in September 2019.

The lineup included:
Dave Matthews Band
The Lumineers
Dispatch
Marcus King
Joan Jett
Bad Religion
The B-52’s
Blind Melon
Cat Power
Steel Pulse
Pigeons Playing Ping Pong
Rainbow Kitten Surprise

2020
The 2020 festival was postponed to 2021 due to the COVID-19 pandemic.

2021

The 2021 festival featured, among others:
Pearl Jam
Smashing Pumpkins
Patti Smith
Billy Idol
Ani Difranco
Cory Henry
Lord Huron
Matt & Kim
Orville Peck
The Avett Brothers
Tank and the Bangas

Professional surfers included:
Balaram Stack
Eric Geiselman

Art exhibition

Patti Smith, Eddie Vedder, Mike McCready and Jeff Ament of Pearl Jam, and others exhibited artwork inside the Transparent Gallery pop-up at the festival. Musicians and artists showing their artwork also included Scott Avett of the Avett Brothers, Billy Morrison of Billy Idol, Trevor Terndrup of Moon Taxi, Tim Showalter of Stand Up Oaks, Liz Cooper, Briston Maroney, Hirie, James Black and James Herdman of Jackson Pines, Danny Clinch, muralist Porkchop and others.

2022 
The 2022 festival was held September 17-18, 2022.  Among the more notable artists were the following:

Saturday September 17th, 2022 
 Stevie Nicks
 My Morning Jacket
 Billy Strings
 Gary Clark Jr. 
 Boy George & Culture Club
 Fletcher
 The Backstreet Lovers
 Peach Pit
 Skip Marley
 Celisse
 Annie DiRusso
 Aly & Aj
 The Surfrajettes
 Dogs In A Pile
 Dentist

Sunday, September 18th, 2022 
 Green Day
 Cage the Elephant
 The Head and the Heart
 Idles
 Wet Leg
 Courtney Barnett
 Michael Franti and Spearhead
 Tai Verdes
 Shakey Graves
 Andy Frasco & The UN
 Cimafunk
 The Little Mermen
 Calder Allen
 Lost in Society
 The Vansaders

Surf 
The 2022 festival featured pro surfers including, among others, Cory Lopez, Sam Hammer, Cassidy McClain, and Eric Geiselman.  The surfers competed in the "North Beach Rumble," a team surf contest.

Late Night Shows 
The 2022 Festival included four (4) "Late Night Shows" that took place after the festival's normal operating hours.  Shows took place at Asbury Park local venues, such as The Stone Pony and The Wonder Bar, featuring The Backseat Lovers, Gods, Yawn, The Ocean Ave Stomp, and The Surfajettes.

2023 
The 2023 festival was held September 16-17, 2023. The 5th annual festival included the following:

Saturday, September 16th, 2023

 The Killers
 Greta Van Fleet
 Nathaniel Rateliff & The Night Sweats
 Sheryl Crow
 Tash Sultana
 Royal Blood
 Bob Moses
 Cory Wong
 Oteil & Friends
 Living Colour
 Babe Rainbow
 Surfer Girl
 Snacktime
 Quincy Mumford
 Yawn Mower

Sunday, September 17th, 2023

 Foo Fighters
 Weezer
 Rebelution
 Mt. Joy
 The Beach Boys
 The Breeders
 Tegan & Sara
 Stephen Sanchez
 Joey Valence & Brae
 Adam Melchor
 Daniel Donato's Cosmic Country
 Easy Star All-Stars
 Sunflower Bean
 Waiting on Mongo
 Alexander Simone & Whodat?

References

External links

Rock festivals in the United States
Jam band festivals
Punk rock festivals
Music festivals in New Jersey
Asbury Park, New Jersey